A by-election was held in the Legislative Assembly of Queensland seat of Surfers Paradise on 5 May 2001. It was triggered by the resignation of sitting National Party member Rob Borbidge.

The by-election was won by independent candidate Lex Bell.

Background

Rob Borbidge first entered parliament as the National member for Surfers Paradise at the 1980 state election. He became leader of his party in 1991 and Premier of Queensland in 1996, following the Mundingburra by-election. Borbidge's government was defeated at the 1998 state election, but Borbidge remained National Party leader, leading his party to landslide defeat at the 2001 state election. Subsequent to that defeat, Borbidge announced his retirement from politics.

Results

The by-election was a resounding win for Gold Coast City councillor Lex Bell. Also of note was the performance of the Liberal Party, who performed considerably better than their coalition partner, the National Party; even though this had been a National Party seat since 1980. However, voters were outraged at being forced to the polls for the second time in three months, and took out their anger on Borbidge's replacement as National candidate Susie Douglas; the Nationals' primary vote plunged to only eight percent.

After this election, the Nationals effectively ceded Surfers Paradise to the Liberals, and would never contest the seat again before the merger of the Queensland National and Liberal parties into the Liberal National Party.

Aftermath
Lex Bell was defeated by Liberal candidate John-Paul Langbroek in a rematch at the 2004 state election.

See also
List of Queensland state by-elections
Electoral results for the district of Surfers Paradise - Results for Surfers Paradise from 1972 to present

References
 

2001 elections in Australia
Queensland state by-elections
2000s in Queensland
May 2001 events in Australia